Freedom High School is located in Morganton, North Carolina.

Design 

Freedom High School opened for its students in the 1973–1974 school year. It had an open classroom floor plan (no walls between classes). There are now 'half walls' separating classes so that one class can no longer see into another, though students are still able to hear other classes.

The majority of academic classes are now taught in a separate, two-story building with full walls between each classroom.

Student Body Demographics 
U.S. News & World Report states that Freedom has a student body that is 47.5% minority and 48% economically disadvantaged. Freedom has 64 full time teachers for a student to teacher ratio of approximately 20:1. Freedom has a 90% graduation rate.

Athletics/Extracurricular
Freedom High School is a member of the North Carolina High School Athletic Association (NCHSAA), and are classified as a 3A school. Previously Freedom competed as a 4A school (the states highest classification for high school athletics) until losing enrollment with the opening of Patton High School in 2007, who are also located in Morganton. Freedom is a member of the Northwestern 3A/4A conference for all sports. The school mascot is the Patriot and the colors are Red, White and Blue.

Sports offered at Freedom include football, soccer, cross country, basketball, swimming, wrestling, lacrosse, baseball, tennis, track and field, volleyball and softball. Freedom has been NCHSAA state champions once each in 4A boys golf (1991), 4A volleyball (1999), and 3A girls golf (2021). Freedom has won five state championships in girls basketball (1989, 1994, 1995, 2002 and 2016) the first four of which were as a 4A school, while the last was 3A, with the Lady Patriots also going undefeated for the 2015–16 season. Freedom has also won four boys basketball state championships (1994, 1998, 2014 and 2020), with the first two as a 4A school and the last two in 3A.

Freedom has a large football stadium with an estimated seating capacity of 10,000. Track and Field events are held in the stadium, but both men's and women's soccer and lacrosse matches are held at the Morganton soccer complex just across the Catawba river. Freedom also has a large gym for basketball, volleyball, and wrestling with an estimated seating capacity of 2,500.

In 2014 Freedom High was named an NCHSAA "Exemplary School" for its athletics and extracurricular activities.

Notable alumni 
 Donald Brown, former Canadian Football League player
 Warren Daniel, politician, served in the North Carolina State Senate
 Robert C. Ervin, North Carolina Superior Court judge
 Sam J. Ervin IV, lawyer and jurist who served on the North Carolina Supreme Court
 Kerri Gardin, former WNBA player
 Alfreda Gerald, singer
 Leon Johnson, former NFL running back
 Paige Summers, model

References

External links 
 FHS Website 
 Burke County Public Schools

Schools in Burke County, North Carolina
Public high schools in North Carolina